The 2015 Greensboro mayoral election was held on November 3, 2015 to elect the mayor of Greensboro, North Carolina. It saw the reelection of Nancy Vaughan.

Results

Primary 
The date of the primary was October 8.

General election

References 

Greensboro mayoral
Mayoral elections in Greensboro, North Carolina
Greensboro